Novoyapparovo (Yañı Yappar) is a rural locality (a selo) in Kazangulovsky Selsoviet, Davlekanovsky District, Bashkortostan, Russia. The population was 408 as of 2010. There are 2 streets.

Geography 
Novoyapparovo is located 18 km northeast of Davlekanovo (the district's administrative centre) by road. Staroyapparovo is the nearest rural locality.

References 

Rural localities in Davlekanovsky District